Sean Pouche is an American politician serving as a member of the Missouri House of Representatives from the 13th district. Elected in November 2020, he assumed office on January 5, 2021.

Early life and education 
Pouche was raised in Platte County, Missouri and graduated from Rockhurst High School. He earned a Bachelor of Science degree from the United States Merchant Marine Academy.

Career 
After graduating from college, Pouche received his commission to the United States Navy Reserve. He was later deployed to Iraq and Afghanistan, where he served as an advisor to NATO officials. Pouche has also worked for his family's business, Platte Rental & Supply. Pouche was elected to the Missouri House of Representatives in 2020, placing first in the Republican primary and defeating Democratic nominee Victor Abundis in the general election.

Electoral History

References 

United States Merchant Marine Academy alumni
Republican Party members of the Missouri House of Representatives
Living people
Year of birth missing (living people)
People from Platte County, Missouri